Dream Mall station is a light rail station of the Circular Line of the Kaohsiung rapid transit system. It is located in Cianjhen District, Kaohsiung, Taiwan.

Station overview
The station is a street-level station with two side platforms. It is located at the junction of Shihdai Blvd and Chenggong 2nd Road, beside Dream Mall, a large shopping center.

Station layout

Around the station
 Dream Mall
 Kaohsiung, Taiwan Sugar Logistics Park
 Qianzhen Triangle Park

References

2015 establishments in Taiwan
Railway stations opened in 2015
Circular light rail stations